Lucien Napoléon Bonaparte-Wyse (13 January 1845 – 15 June 1909) was a French engineer. He was born in Paris as the son of Laetitia Bonaparte-Wyse, daughter of Lucien Bonaparte and estranged wife of the Irish politician Sir Thomas Wyse; Lucien Napoléon Bonaparte-Wyse's real father was a British army officer, Captain Studholme John Hodgson. He joined the French navy as a midshipman on the ship Amphion, based in Toulon. Commissioned by the French company Compagnie universelle du canal interocéanique de Panama he obtained a concession to build a canal from the Colombian government. He made two trips to Panama to study the project and the concluded it was feasible. The agreement, known as the "Wyse Concession" was valid 99 years and allowed the company to dig a canal and exploit it. The Panama Scandal allowed Ferdinand de Lesseps to redeem the rights. After this Bonaparte-Wyse wrote his memoirs, intending to prove to investors that the project was viable. The United States would get the concession and build the canal.

He married on 14 September 1871, in London, Mary Rose White (Port-au-Prince 1855 - Nice 1875) :
 Napoléon Jérôme Bonaparte-Wyse (1874-1940) married in 1904 Antoinette de Raoulx de Raousset-Boulbon (1881-1931). They had one daughter and one son.
 Marie Letizia Bonaparte-Wyse (1875-1959) married in 1895, in Toulon, Rear Admiral Aristide Henry Nicolas Denis Bergasse du Petit-Thouars (1872-1932). They had four daughters.

He died at Cap Brun in Cannes on 15 June 1909, at the age of 64 years.

References 

1845 births
1909 deaths
Suez Canal
Lucien
 French Navy officers